Richard Birmingham (? – c. 1726) was an American judge who served as Justice of the Colonial Delaware Supreme Court from 1713 to 1717.

He was appointed an associate justice on October 3, 1713, and served in that capacity for less than half a year before being named chief justice on March 10, 1714, the position he served in until August 1, 1717. He died in c. 1726.

References

1720s deaths
Justices of the Delaware Supreme Court
Date of birth unknown